Leucine rich repeat containing 37A is a protein in humans that is encoded by the LRRC37A gene.

References

Further reading